Venusberg is a village and a former municipality in the district Erzgebirgskreis, in Saxony, Germany. Since 1 January 2010, it is part of the municipality Drebach.

History

In 1945 there was a concentration camp in Venusberg. 1000 Jewish women had to work for the Junkers airplane factory called "Venuswerke".

Literature

Cziborra, Pascal. KZ Venusberg. Der verschleppte Tod. Lorbeer Verlag. Bielefeld 2008

Former municipalities in Saxony
Erzgebirgskreis
Holocaust locations in Germany